Said Brahmi (Arabic:سعيد براهمي; born 24 June 1995) is a Qatari footballer. He currently plays for Al-Khor. Said has also represented Qatar National U19, and was a part of the squad who competed and were eventual champions at 2014 AFC U-19 Championship.

References

External links
 

Qatari footballers
1995 births
Living people
Al-Khor SC players
Qatar Stars League players
Association football midfielders
Qatari people of Algerian descent
Aspire Academy (Qatar) players
Qatar under-20 international footballers
Qatar youth international footballers